The 1794–95 United States House of Representatives elections were held on various dates in various states between August 25, 1794 (New Hampshire), and September 5, 1795 (Kentucky). Each state set its own date for its elections to the House of Representatives before the first session of the 4th United States Congress convened on December 7, 1795. They were held during President George Washington's second term. Elections were held for all 105 seats, representing 15 states.

In the second election for the House of Representatives with organized political parties, the Democratic-Republican Party, led by Thomas Jefferson, once again defeated the Federalist Party, led by Alexander Hamilton, and slightly increased their majority. These new wins by the Democratic-Republicans can mostly be attributed to the popularity of Jeffersonian ideas of agrarian democracy in the Western territories of the United States.

Election summary 
During this period, each state fixed its own date for a congressional general election. Elections took place both in the even-numbered year before and in the odd-numbered year when a Congress convened. In some states, the congressional delegation was not elected until after the legal start of the Congress (on the 4th day of March in the odd-numbered year).

Special elections 
There were special and late elections to the 3rd and 4th Congresses in 1794 and 1795.

3rd Congress 

|-
! 
| John Francis Mercer
|  | Anti-Administration
| 1791 
|  | Incumbent resigned April 13, 1794.New member elected May 5, 1794.Anti-Administration hold.Successor also elected to the next term, see below.
| nowrap | 

|-
! 
| Alexander Gillon
|  | Anti-Administration
| 1793
|  | Incumbent died October 6, 1794.New member elected October 13–14, 1794.Pro-Administration gain.Successor also elected to the next term, see below.
| nowrap | 

|-
! 
| Uriah Forrest
|  | Pro-Administration
| 1792
|  | Incumbent resigned November 8, 1794.New member elected December 8, 1794.Pro-Administration hold.Successor was not elected to the next term, see below.Successor seated in January 1795.
| nowrap | 

|-
! 
| Abraham Clark
|  | Pro-Administration
| 1791
|  | Incumbent died September 15, 1794.New member elected January 11, 1795.Pro-Administration hold.Successor had already been elected to the next term, see below.Successor seated January 29, 1795.
| nowrap | 

|-
! 
| John Barnwell
|  | Pro-Administration
| 1794
|  | Incumbent representative-elect declined to serve.New member elected January 19–20, 1795.Anti-Administration gain.Successor seated December 7, 1795.
| nowrap | 

|}

4th Congress 

|-
! 
| Jonathan Trumbull Jr.
|  | Federalist
| 1788
|  | Incumbent Representative-elect declined to serve when elected U.S. Senator.New member elected April 13, 1795.Federalist hold.Successor seated December 7, 1795.
| nowrap | 

|-
! 
| Alexander Mebane
|  | Democratic-Republican
| 1793
|  | Incumbent died July 5, 1795.New member elected August 14, 1795.Democratic-Republican hold.Successor seated December 7, 1795.
| nowrap | 

|}

Connecticut 

|-
! rowspan=7 | 
| James Hillhouse
|  | Pro-Administration
| 1790
|  | Incumbent re-elected as a Federalist.
| rowspan=7 nowrap | 

|-
| Amasa Learned
|  | Pro-Administration
| 1790
|  | Incumbent retired.New member elected.Federalist gain.

|-
| Joshua Coit
|  | Pro-Administration
| 1792
|  | Incumbent re-elected as a Federalist.

|-
| Jonathan Trumbull Jr.
|  | Pro-Administration
| 1788
|  | Incumbent retired to run for U.S. Senator.New member elected.Federalist gain.

|-
| Jeremiah Wadsworth
|  | Pro-Administration
| 1788
|  | Incumbent retired.New member elected.Federalist gain.

|-
| Zephaniah Swift
|  | Pro-Administration
| 1792
|  | Incumbent re-elected as a Federalist.

|-
| Uriah Tracy
|  | Pro-Administration
| 1792
|  | Incumbent re-elected as a Federalist.

|}

Delaware 

Only two candidates are recorded for Delaware's congressional election in 1794, suggesting that the voting procedure in place for the first three Congresses for two candidates had been changed.

|-
! 
| Henry Latimer
|  | Pro-Administration
| 1792
|  | Incumbent lost re-election.New member elected.Democratic-Republican gain.
| nowrap | 

|}

Georgia 

|-
! rowspan=2 | 
| Abraham Baldwin
|  | Anti-Administration
| 1789
|  | Incumbent re-elected as a Democratic-Republican.
| rowspan=2 nowrap | 

|-
| Thomas P. Carnes
|  | Anti-Administration
| 1792
|  | Incumbent lost re-election.New member elected.Democratic-Republican gain.

|}

Kentucky 

|-
! 
| Christopher Greenup
|  | Anti-Administration
| 1792
|  | Incumbent re-elected as a Democratic-Republican.
| nowrap | 

|-
! 
| Alexander D. Orr
|  | Anti-Administration
| 1792
|  | Incumbent re-elected as a Democratic-Republican.
| nowrap | 

|}

Maryland 

|-
! 
| George Dent
|  | Pro-Administration
| 1792
|  | Incumbent re-elected as a Federalist.
| nowrap | 

|-
! 
| John Francis Mercer
|  | Anti-Administration
| 1791 
|  | Incumbent resigned April 13, 1794.New member elected.Democratic-Republican gain.Successor also elected to finish the term.
| nowrap | 

|-
! 
| Uriah Forrest
|  | Pro-Administration
| 1792
|  | Incumbent retired.New member elected.Federalist gain.
| nowrap | 

|-
! 
| Thomas Sprigg
|  | Anti-Administration
| 1792
|  | Incumbent re-elected as a Democratic-Republican.
| nowrap | 

|-
! 
| Samuel Smith
|  | Anti-Administration
| 1792
|  | Incumbent re-elected as a Democratic-Republican.
| nowrap | 

|-
! 
| Gabriel Christie
|  | Anti-Administration
| 1792
|  | Incumbent re-elected as a Democratic-Republican.
| nowrap | 

|-
! 
| William Hindman
|  | Pro-Administration
| 1792
|  | Incumbent re-elected as a Federalist.
| nowrap | 

|-
! 
| William V. Murray
|  | Pro-Administration
| 1790
|  | Incumbent re-elected as a Federalist.
| nowrap | 

|}

Massachusetts 

Massachusetts redistricted between the 3rd and 4th Congress, dividing itself into 14 districts. The -s were in the District of Maine (the modern State of Maine). A majority was required for election. Additional ballots were required in five districts due to the majority requirement not being met on the first ballot.

|-
! 
| Theodore Sedgwick
|  | Pro-Administration
| 1789
|  | Incumbent re-elected as a Federalist.
| nowrap | 

|-
! 
| William Lyman
|  | Anti-Administration
| 1792
|  | Incumbent re-elected as a Democratic-Republican.
| nowrap | 

|-
! 
| colspan=3 | None (district created)
|  | New seat.New member elected.Federalist gain.
| nowrap | 

|-
! 
| Dwight Foster
|  | Pro-Administration
| 1792
|  | Incumbent re-elected as a Federalist.
| nowrap | 

|-
! 
| Peleg Coffin Jr.
|  | Pro-Administration
| 1792
|  | Incumbent lost re-election.New member elected.Democratic-Republican gain.
| nowrap | 

|-
! 
| colspan=3 | None (district created)
|  | New seat.New member elected.Federalist gain.
| nowrap | 

|-
! 
| David Cobb
|  | Pro-Administration
| 1792
|  | Incumbent lost re-election.New member elected.Federalist gain.
| nowrap |  First ballot:David Cobb (Federalist) 42.3%George Leonard (Federalist) 35.8%Phanuel Bishop (Democratic-Republican) 21.9%Second ballot:David Cobb (Federalist) 39.9%George Leonard (Federalist) 39.9%Phanuel Bishop (Democratic-Republican) 20.2%Third ballot:George Leonard (Federalist) 48.9%David Cobb (Federalist) 17.4%John Smith 13.7%Phanuel Bishop (Democratic-Republican) 12.5%Scattering 7.6%Fourth ballot:

|-
! 
| Fisher Ames
|  | Pro-Administration
| 1788
|  | Incumbent re-elected as a Federalist.
| nowrap | 

|-
! 
| Samuel Dexter
|  | Pro-Administration
| 1792
|  | Incumbent lost re-election.New member elected.Democratic-Republican gain.
| nowrap |  First ballot:Samuel Dexter (Federalist) 40.5%Elbridge Gerry (Democratic-Republican) 30.9%Joseph Bradley Varnum (Democratic-Republican) 28.6%Second ballot:Joseph Bradley Varnum (Democratic-Republican) 49.4%Samuel Dexter (Federalist) 48.8%Scattering 1.8%Third ballot:

|-
! rowspan=2 | 
| Benjamin Goodhue
|  | Pro-Administration
| 1789
|  | Incumbent re-elected as a Federalist.
| rowspan=2 nowrap | 

|-
| Samuel Holten
|  | Anti-Administration
| 1792
|  | Incumbent lost re-election in a redistricting contest.Federalist loss.

|-
! 
| colspan=3 | None (district created)
|  | New seat.New member elected.Federalist gain.
| nowrap |  First ballot:Theophilus Bradbury (Federalist) 43.5%Bailey Bartlett (Federalist) 19.8%Josiah Smith (Democratic-Republican) 10.5%Stephen Cross 9.1%Theophilus Parsons 7.0%Scattering 10.1%Second ballot:Theophilus Bradbury (Federalist) 38.1%William Pearson 36.6%Bailey Bartlett (Federalist) 25.3%Third ballot:

|-
! 
| Henry Dearborn
|  | Anti-Administration
| 1792
|  | Incumbent re-elected as a Democratic-Republican.
| nowrap | 

|-
! 
| Peleg Wadsworth
|  | Pro-Administration
| 1792
|  | Incumbent re-elected as a Federalist.
| nowrap |  First ballot:Peleg Wadsworth (Federalist) 44.1%William Widgery (Democratic-Republican) 33.4%Stephen Longfellow 10.0%Samuel Thompson 5.3%Scattering 7.3%Second ballot:

|-
! 
| George Thatcher
|  | Pro-Administration
| 1788
|  | Incumbent re-elected as a Federalist.
| nowrap |  First ballot:George Thatcher (Federalist) 45.7%Nathaniel Wells 31.6%Ichabod Godwin 8.8%Joseph Tucker 6.4%Scattering 7.4%Second ballot:

|}

New Hampshire 

Under New Hampshire's electoral laws, a majority of voters (12.5% of votes) was required for election. Only three candidates achieved a majority, and so a run-off election was held for the fourth seat.

|-
! rowspan=4 | 
| Jeremiah Smith
|  | Pro-Administration
| 1790
|  | Incumbent re-elected as a Federalist.
| nowrap rowspan=4 | First ballot :

|-
| John Samuel Sherburne
|  |Anti-Administration
| 1792
|  | Incumbent re-elected as a Democratic-Republican.

|-
| Nicholas Gilman
|  | Pro-Administration
| 1788/89
|  | Incumbent re-elected as a Federalist.

|-
| Paine Wingate
|  |Pro-Administration
| 1792
|  | Incumbent lost re-election.New member elected.Federalist gain.

|}

New Jersey 

|-
! 
| Elias Boudinot
|  | Pro-Administration
| 1789
|  | Incumbent retired.New member elected.Federalist gain.
| rowspan=5 nowrap | 

|-
! 
| colspan=3 | Vacant
|  | Abraham Clark (Pro-Administration) died September 15, 1794.New member elected.Federalist gain.

|-
! 
| Jonathan Dayton
|  | Pro-Administration
| 1791
|  | Incumbent re-elected as a Federalist.

|-
! 
| Lambert Cadwalader
|  | Pro-Administration
| 17891792
|  | Incumbent lost re-election.New member elected.Federalist gain.

|-
! 
| John Beatty
|  | Pro-Administration
| 1792
|  | Incumbent lost re-election.New member elected.Federalist gain.

|}

New York 

New York's districts were not numbered at the time, but were later numbered retroactively.

|-
! 
| colspan=3 | Vacant
|  | Incumbent moved to the .New member elected.Democratic-Republican gain.
| nowrap | 

|-
! 
| John Watts
|  | Pro-Administration
| 1793
|  | Incumbent lost re-election.New member elected.Democratic-Republican gain.
| nowrap | 

|-
! 
| Philip Van Courtlandt
|  | Anti-Administration
| 1793
|  | Incumbent re-elected as a Democratic-Republican.
| nowrap | 

|-
! 
| Peter Van Gaasbeck
|  | Pro-Administration
| 1793
|  | Incumbent retired.New member elected.Democratic-Republican gain.
| nowrap | 

|-
! 
| Theodorus Bailey
|  | Anti-Administration
| 1793
|  | Incumbent re-elected as a Democratic-Republican.
| nowrap | 

|-
! 
| Ezekiel Gilbert
|  | Pro-Administration
| 1793
|  | Incumbent re-elected as a Federalist.
| nowrap | 

|-
! rowspan=2 | 
| John E. Van Alen
|  | Pro-Administration
| 1793
|  | Incumbent re-elected as a Federalist.
| nowrap rowspan=2 nowrap | 

|-
| Thomas Tredwell
|  | Anti-Administration
| 1791 (Special)
|  | Incumbent lost re-election.Democratic-Republican loss.

|-
! 
| Henry Glen
|  | Pro-Administration
| 1793
|  | Incumbent re-elected as a Federalist.
| nowrap | 

|-
! 
| James Gordon
|  | Pro-Administration
| 1790
|  | Incumbent retired.New member elected.Democratic-Republican gain.
| nowrap | 

|-
! 
| colspan=3 | Vacant
|  | Incumbent Silas Talbot (Pro-Administration) resigned earlier to accept an appointment to the NavyFederalist gain.
| nowrap | 

|}

North Carolina 

|-
! 
| Joseph McDowell
|  | Anti-Administration
| 1793
|  | Incumbent lost re-election.New member elected.Democratic-Republican gain.
| nowrap | 

|-
! 
| Matthew Locke
|  | Anti-Administration
| 1793
|  | Incumbent re-elected as a Democratic-Republican.
| nowrap | 

|-
! 
| Joseph Winston
|  | Anti-Administration
| 1793
|  | Incumbent lost re-election.New member elected.Democratic-Republican gain.
| nowrap | 

|-
! 
| Alexander Mebane
|  | Anti-Administration
| 1793
|  | Incumbent re-elected as a Democratic-Republican.
| nowrap | 

|-
! 
| Nathaniel Macon
|  | Anti-Administration
| 1791
|  | Incumbent re-elected as a Democratic-Republican.
| nowrap | 

|-
! 
| James Gillespie
|  | Anti-Administration
| 1793
|  | Incumbent re-elected as a Democratic-Republican.
| nowrap | 

|-
! 
| William B. Grove
|  | Pro-Administration
| 1791
|  | Incumbent re-elected as a Federalist.
| nowrap | 

|-
! 
| William J. Dawson
|  | Anti-Administration
| 1793
|  | Incumbent lost re-election.New member elected.Democratic-Republican gain.
| nowrap | 

|-
! 
| Thomas Blount
|  | Anti-Administration
| 1793
|  | Incumbent re-elected as a Democratic-Republican.
| nowrap | 

|-
! 
| Benjamin Williams
|  | Anti-Administration
| 1793
|  | Incumbent lost re-election.New member elected.Democratic-Republican gain.
| nowrap | 

|}

Pennsylvania 

Pennsylvania once again divided itself into districts instead of electing representatives at-large, as it had for the 3rd Congress. The state divided intself into 12 districts, one of which (the ) had two seats. Pennsylvania would continue to use one or more plural districts until 1842.

|-
! 
| Thomas Fitzsimons
|  | Pro-Administration
| 1788
|  | Incumbent lost re-election.New member elected.Democratic-Republican gain.
| nowrap | 

|-
! 
| Frederick Muhlenberg
|  | Anti-Administration
| 1788
|  | Incumbent re-elected as a Democratic-Republican.
| nowrap | 

|-
! 
| colspan=3 | None (district created)
|  | New seat.New member elected.Federalist gain.
| nowrap | 

|-
! rowspan=2 | 
| colspan=3 | None (district created)
|  | New seat.New member elected.Federalist gain.
| rowspan=2 nowrap | 

|-
| Peter Muhlenberg
|  | Anti-Administration
| 17881792
|  | Incumbent lost re-election.New member elected.Democratic-Republican gain.James Morris disputed the election. The original returns showed Morris in 2nd place and Richards in a close 3rd place, but Richards disputed it. Morris died July 10, 1795, before the House could act. The Elections Committee ruled in favor of Richards on January 18, 1796.

|-
! 
| Daniel Hiester
|  | Anti-Administration
| 1788
|  | Incumbent re-elected as a Democratic-Republican.
| nowrap | 

|-
! 
| colspan=3 | None (district created)
|  | New seat.New member elected.Democratic-Republican gain.
| nowrap | 

|-
! 
| John W. Kittera
|  | Pro-Administration
| 1791
|  | Incumbent re-elected as a Federalist.
| nowrap | 

|-
! 
| Thomas Hartley
|  | Pro-Administration
| 1788
|  | Incumbent re-elected as a Federalist.
| nowrap | 

|-
! rowspan=2 | 
| Andrew Gregg
|  | Anti-Administration
| 1791
|  | Incumbent re-elected as a Democratic-Republican.
| rowspan=2 nowrap | 

|-
| William Irvine
|  | Anti-Administration
| 1792
|  | Incumbent lost re-election.New member elected.Democratic-Republican gain.

|-
! 
| colspan=3 | None (district created)
|  | New seat.New member elected.Democratic-Republican gain.
| nowrap | 

|-
! 
| William Findley
|  | Anti-Administration
| 1791
|  | Incumbent re-elected as a Democratic-Republican.
| nowrap | 

|-
! 
| Thomas Scott
|  | Pro-Administration
| 17881792
|  | Incumbent lost re-election.New member elected.Democratic-Republican gain.
| nowrap | 

|}

Rhode Island 

|-
!  Seat A
| Benjamin Bourne
|  | Pro-Administration
| 1790
|  | Incumbent re-elected as a Federalist.
| nowrap | 

|-
!  Seat B
| Francis Malbone
|  | Pro-Administration
| 1792
|  | Incumbent re-elected as a Federalist.
| nowrap | 

|}

South Carolina 

Electoral data are only available for the 1st and 5th district of South Carolina's 6 districts at the time of the elections of 1794.

|-
! 
| William L. Smith
|  | Pro-Administration
| 1788
|  | Incumbent re-elected as a Federalist.
| nowrap | 

|-
! 
| colspan=3 | New seat
|  | New member elected.Democratic-Republican gain.Successor declined to serve and a special election was held to fill the resulting vacancy, electing Wade Hampton (Democratic-Republican).
| nowrap | 

|-
! 
| Lemuel Benton
|  | Anti-Administration
| 1793
|  | Incumbent re-elected as a Democratic-Republican.
| nowrap | 

|-
! 
| Richard Winn
|  | Anti-Administration
| 1793
|  | Incumbent re-elected as a Democratic-Republican.
| nowrap | 

|-
! rowspan=2 | 
| Alexander Gillon
|  | Anti-Administration
| 1793
|  | Incumbent died October 6, 1794.New member elected.Federalist gain.Successor also elected to finish the term, see above.
| rowspan=2 nowrap | 

|-
| John Hunter 
|  | Anti-Administration
| 1793
|  | Incumbent lost re-election.Anti-Administration loss.

|-
! 
| Andrew Pickens
|  | Anti-Administration
| 1793
|  | Unknown if incumbent retired or lost re-election.Democratic-Republican gain.
| nowrap | 

|}
Representative-elect Barnwell of the  declined to serve. A special election was held to fill the resulting vacancy, electing Wade Hampton (Democratic-Republican).

Southwest Territory 
See Non-voting delegates, below.

Vermont 

Vermont law required a majority for election to Congress, with a second election to be held if the first did not return a majority. Run-off elections were required in both districts.

|-
! 
| Israel Smith
|  | Anti-Administration
| 1791
|  | Incumbent re-elected as a Democratic-Republican.The election was contested but eventually upheld.
| nowrap |  First ballot :Matthew Lyon (Democratic-Republican) 41.7%Israel Smith (Democratic-Republican) 32.9%Isaac Tichenor (Federalist) 9.9%Gideon Olin (Democratic-Republican) 8.7%Others 6.8%Second ballot :

|-
! 
| Nathaniel Niles
|  | Anti-Administration
| 1791
|  | Incumbent lost re-election.New member elected.Federalist gain.
| nowrap |  First ballot :Nathaniel Niles (Democratic-Republican) 31.6%Daniel Buck (Federalist) 21.2%Jonathan Hunt 11.0%Stephen Jacob 10.9%Lewis R. Morris (Federalist) 8.3%Cornelius Lynde 4.7%Paul Brigham 3.3%Lot Hall 2.7%Elijah Robinson 1.3%Others 4.8%Second ballot :

|}

Virginia 

|-
! 
| Robert Rutherford
|  | Anti-Administration
| 1793
|  | Incumbent re-elected as a Democratic-Republican.
| nowrap | 

|-
! 
| Andrew Moore
|  | Anti-Administration
| 1789
|  | Incumbent re-elected as a Democratic-Republican.
| nowrap | 

|-
! 
| Joseph Neville
|  | Anti-Administration
| 1793
|  | Incumbent lost re-election.New member elected.Democratic-Republican gain.
| nowrap | 

|-
! 
| Francis Preston
|  | Anti-Administration
| 1793
|  | Incumbent re-elected as a Democratic-Republican.
| nowrap | 

|-
! 
| George Hancock
|  | Pro-Administration
| 1793
|  | Incumbent re-elected as a Federalist.
| nowrap | 

|-
! 
| Isaac Coles
|  | Anti-Administration
| 1793
|  | Incumbent re-elected as a Democratic-Republican.
| nowrap | 

|-
! 
| Abraham B. Venable
|  | Anti-Administration
| 1790
|  | Incumbent re-elected as a Democratic-Republican.
| nowrap | 

|-
! 
| Thomas Claiborne
|  | Anti-Administration
| 1793
|  | Incumbent re-elected as a Democratic-Republican.
| nowrap | 

|-
! 
| William B. Giles
|  | Anti-Administration
| 1790
|  | Incumbent re-elected as a Democratic-Republican.
| nowrap | 

|-
! 
| Carter B. Harrison
|  | Anti-Administration
| 1793
|  | Incumbent re-elected as a Democratic-Republican.
| nowrap | 

|-
! 
| Josiah Parker
|  | Pro-Administration
| 1789
|  | Incumbent re-elected as a Federalist.
| nowrap | 

|-
! 
| John Page
|  | Anti-Administration
| 1789
|  | Incumbent re-elected as a Democratic-Republican.
| nowrap | 

|-
! 
| Samuel Griffin
|  | Pro-Administration
| 1789
|  | Incumbent retired.New member elected.Democratic-Republican gain.The loser unsuccessfully contested the election
| nowrap | 

|-
! 
| Francis Walker
|  | Anti-Administration
| 1793
|  | Incumbent retired.New member elected.Democratic-Republican gain.
| nowrap | 

|-
! 
| James Madison Jr.
|  | Anti-Administration
| 1789
|  | Incumbent re-elected as a Democratic-Republican.
| nowrap | 

|-
! 
| Anthony New
|  | Anti-Administration
| 1793
|  | Incumbent re-elected as a Democratic-Republican.
| nowrap | 

|-
! 
| Richard Bland Lee
|  | Pro-Administration
| 1789
|  | Incumbent lost re-election.New member elected.Democratic-Republican gain.
| nowrap | 

|-
! 
| John Nicholas
|  | Anti-Administration
| 1793
|  | Incumbent re-elected as a Democratic-Republican.
| nowrap | 

|-
! 
| John Heath
|  | Anti-Administration
| 1793
|  | Incumbent re-elected as a Democratic-Republican.
| nowrap | 

|}

Non-voting delegates

3rd Congress 

|-
! 
| colspan=3 | None (district created)
| New non-partisan delegate elected on an unknown date by the territorial legislature.Member seated September 3, 1794 as Congress's first non-voting delegate.Successor also elected to the next term, see below.
| nowrap | 

|}

4th Congress 

|-
! 
| James White
| Non-partisan
| 1794 
| Non-partisan delegate re-elected on an unknown date by the territorial legislature.
| nowrap | 

|}

See also 
 1794 United States elections
 List of United States House of Representatives elections (1789–1822)
 1794–95 United States Senate elections
 3rd United States Congress
 4th United States Congress

Notes

References

Bibliography

External links 
 Office of the Historian (Office of Art & Archives, Office of the Clerk, U.S. House of Representatives)